Anamastigona is a genus of millipedes in the family Anthroleucosomatidae. There are about 20 described species in Anamastigona, found mainly in Europe and the Middle East.

Species
These 20 species belong to the genus Anamastigona:

 Anamastigona alba (Strasser, 1960) - Bulgaria
 Anamastigona albanensis Mauriès, Golovatch & Stoev, 1997 - Albania
 Anamastigona aspromontis (Strasser, 1970) - Italy
 Anamastigona bilselii (Verhoeff, 1940) - Bulgaria, European Turkey, Greece
 Anamastigona cypria Vagalinski & Golovatch, 2016 - Cyprus
 Anamastigona delcevi (Strasser, 1973) - Bulgaria
 Anamastigona falcata (Gulicka, 1967) - Bulgaria
 Anamastigona halophila	(Verhoeff, 1940) - Turkey
 Anamastigona hauseri (Strasser, 1974) - Greece
 Anamastigona hispidula (Silvestri, 1895) - Italy
 Anamastigona lepenicae (Strasser, 1975) - Bulgaria
 Anamastigona matsakisi Mauriès & Karamaouna, 1984 - Greece
 Anamastigona mediterranea Curcic, Makarov & Lymberakis, 2001 - Crete
 Anamastigona meridionalis Silvestri, 1898 - Sicily
 Anamastigona penicillata (Attems, 1902) - Crete
 Anamastigona pentelicona (Verhoeff, 1925) - Greece
 Anamastigona pulchella (Silvestri, 1894) - Europe
 Anamastigona radmani Makarov et al, 2007 - Croatia
 Anamastigona strasseri Vagalinski & Golovatch, 2016 - Cyprus
 Anamastigona terraesanctae Golovatch & Makarov, 2011 - Israel

References

Further reading

 

Chordeumatida